Rock Hero is a 2015 Chinese drama film directed by Tan Hua. It was released on June 20, 2015.

Cast
Eric Qin as Wu Wei
Vivien Li as Li Ai
Cya Liu as Jiang Chunxiao
Durizhaorigetu as Haili
Ma Kaiman as Jiang Qian
Li Qingyun as Zuo Jian
Wang Chenhao as Xiaoman
Li Xinran as Rong

Reception

Box office
The film earned  at the Chinese box office.

Critical response
Derek Elley of Film Business Asia gave the film a 6 out of 10, calling it a "well played, though thinly plotted, look back at China's rock scene of the '90s."

References

External links

2010s musical drama films
Chinese musical drama films
2015 drama films
2015 films